Dan Leavy (born 23 May 1994) is an Irish rugby union former player who played for Leinster Rugby. His preferred position was flanker.

Playing career
Leavy was enrolled in the Leinster Rugby academy. He debuted with the Leinster senior team in October 2014 against Edinburgh. It was announced in April 2015 that he had been awarded a senior contract with Leinster following completion of his time in the academy.

Leavy received his first call-up to the senior Ireland team in November 2016, and made his debut on November 12 as a substitute against Canada.
On 18 March 2017 he was called to the Irish bench for the Six Nations against England after Jamie Heaslip turned his ankle during the warmup. He received his first start in June 2017 against Japan. Leavy played in all five of Ireland’s matches in the 2018 Six Nations, coming on as a substitute in the first match, and starting and playing all 80 minutes in the remaining four matches.

Retirement
On the 5th of April 2022, following advice from a doctor he retired due to injury.

References

External links
Leinster Profile
Ireland Profile
Pro14 Profile

1994 births
Living people
People educated at St Michael's College, Dublin
Irish rugby union players
University College Dublin R.F.C. players
Leinster Rugby players
Ireland international rugby union players
Rugby union flankers
Rugby union players from Dublin (city)